The Lignon du Forez (literally Lignon of the Forez; also called Lignon de Chalmazel, literally Lignon of Chalmazel) is a  long river in the Loire department, east-central France. Its source is near Chalmazel. It flows generally east. It is a left tributary of the Loire into which it flows near Feurs.

Communes along its course
This list is ordered from source to mouth:

Chalmazel, Jeansagnière, Sauvain, Saint-Bonnet-le-Courreau, Saint-Georges-en-Couzan, Sail-sous-Couzan, Saint-Sixte, Leigneux, Boën, Trelins, Marcoux, Sainte-Agathe-la-Bouteresse, Montverdun, Saint-Étienne-le-Molard, Poncins, Cleppé, Feurs

References

Rivers of France
Rivers of Loire (department)
Rivers of Auvergne-Rhône-Alpes